Picadilly is a rural community in Kings County, New Brunswick, Canada. It is located immediately next to the village of Sussex Corner and at the eastern terminus of Route 111.

History

Notable people

See also
List of communities in New Brunswick

Communities in Kings County, New Brunswick